Marko Markov Ganchev (born 11 August 1981) is a Bulgarian football player, currently playing for Kaliakra Kavarna as an attacking left midfielder.

He has played for a few clubs, including Neftochimic Burgas, Lokomotiv Plovdiv, Vihren Sandanski, Armenian Premier League Banants Yerevan and Sliven 2000.

Height - 1.71 m.
Weight - 65 kg.
Number - 8

Career 
 1999-2000  Naftex Burgas
 2000-2002   FC Pomorie
 2002-2003  Naftex Burgas
 2003-2004   PFC Sliven
 2004-2005  Lokomotiv Plovdiv
 2005-2007  FC Vihren Sandanski
 2007  Aiolikos
 2008  Banants Yerevan

References

1981 births
Living people
Bulgarian footballers
PFC Lokomotiv Plovdiv players
FC Urartu players
OFC Sliven 2000 players
PFC Kaliakra Kavarna players
First Professional Football League (Bulgaria) players
Expatriate footballers in Armenia
Armenian Premier League players
Association football midfielders